Lebowski Fest is an annual festival that began in 2002 in Louisville, Kentucky, celebrating the 1998 cult film The Big Lebowski by Joel Coen and Ethan Coen. In addition to its home city of Louisville, Lebowski Fest has been held in Louisville, Milwaukee, New York, Las Vegas, Los Angeles, Austin, Seattle, Chicago, San Francisco, Portland, London, Boston, New Orleans and Pittsburgh.

Description 
The annual Lebowski Fest celebrates the 1998 cult film The Big Lebowski by Joel Coen and Ethan Coen. Typically held over two nights, Lebowski Fest features a screening of the film, live music, and a bowling party attended by fans of the movie, many dressed as characters from the film.

History 

The festival began in 2002 in Louisville, Kentucky, and has been held in Milwaukee, New York, Las Vegas, Los Angeles, Austin, Seattle, Chicago, San Francisco, Portland, London, Boston, New Orleans, Raleigh, and Pittsburgh.

Various stars from "The Big Lebowski" have attended the fest over the years, including Jeff Bridges, who in 2005 showed up at Lebowski Fest in Los Angeles singing and playing "The Man in Me" by Bob Dylan, which is featured in the film. In 2011, members of the cast reunited at Lebowski Fest in New York, including Bridges, Julianne Moore, John Goodman, Steve Buscemi, and John Turturro.

Legacy 
Lebowski Fest was co-founded by Louisvillians Will Russell and Scott Shuffitt, who, along with Bill Green and Ben Peskoe, authored the book, I'm a Lebowski, You're a Lebowski: Life, The Big Lebowski, and What Have You, described as "a punch-drunk tribute worthy of a bowling-loving stoner named 'the Dude.'" There is also a documentary about Lebowski Fest, entitled The Achievers.

An account of the first ever Lebowski Fest is included in Mike Walsh's non-fiction account of his endeavor to bowl in all 50 U.S. states, Bowling Across America.

Lebowski Fest has also appeared on the Food Network program "Ace of Cakes." The episode named "The Big Cakeowski" features the Charm City Cakes staff creating and delivering a movie-themed cake to Lebowski Fest in Louisville.

The British equivalent, inspired by Lebowski Fest, is known as The Dude Abides and is held in London.

See also 
 List of attractions and events in the Louisville metropolitan area

References

External links 
 Lebowski Fest official site
 Cult Films with Will and Scott The Lebowski Podcast interview with Will Russell and Scott Shuffitt.
 Interview with the Will Russell and Scott Shuffitt (creators) on the eve of the UK Lebowski fests — Trebuchet magazine
 The book at Amazon

Festivals established in 2002
2002 establishments in Kentucky
Festivals in Louisville, Kentucky
Fan conventions
July events
The Big Lebowski